WKJX (96.7 FM, "The Coast") is a hot adult contemporary formatted broadcast radio station licensed to Elizabeth City, North Carolina, serving Elizabeth City and the Outer Banks.  WKJX is owned and operated by East Carolina Radio of Elizabeth City, Inc.

While WKJX is primarily heard in North Carolina, it can be heard in extreme south-eastern sections of Hampton Roads.

History
WKJX signed on in 1984 as an automated country music station.  In the early 1990s, it was sold to East Carolina Radio who flipped the station's format to Urban Adult Contemporary.  In the late 1990s, the station became a simulcast of sister-station WOBR-FM.

In May 2004, WKJX increased its power to 50,000 watts and split from the simulcast of WOBR-FM, picking up a Light Adult Contemporary format as "Mix 96."

At 9:06 am on April 2, 2010, after stunting the previous day with Bill Cosby stand-up routines, WKJX flipped to an urban hip-hop format, and took on the name "96.7 The Block".

On June 24, 2019 WKJX changed their format from urban hip hop (which moved to WFMZ 104.9 FM Hertford) to hot adult contemporary, branded as "96.7 The Coast".

Previous logo

References

External links
96.7 The Coast Online

KJX
Hot adult contemporary radio stations in the United States